Andrei Suslin (sometimes transliterated Souslin) was a Russian mathematician who  contributed to algebraic K-theory and its connections with algebraic geometry.  He was a Trustee Chair and Professor of mathematics at Northwestern University.

He was born on 27 December 1950 in St. Petersburg, Russia.  As a youth, he was an "all Leningrad" gymnast. He received his PhD from Leningrad University in 1974; his thesis was titled Projective modules over polynomial rings.

In 1976 he and Daniel Quillen independently proved Serre's conjecture about the triviality of algebraic vector bundles on affine space.

In 1982 he and  Alexander Merkurjev proved the Merkurjev–Suslin theorem on the norm residue homomorphism in Milnor K2-theory, with applications to  the Brauer group.

Suslin was an invited speaker at the International Congress of Mathematicians in 1978 and 1994, and he gave a plenary invited address at the Congress in 1986.  He was awarded the Frank Nelson Cole Prize in Algebra in 2000 by the American Mathematical Society for his work on motivic cohomology.

In 2010 special issues of Journal of K-theory
and of Documenta Mathematica
 have been published in honour of his 60th birthday.

He died on 10 July 2018.

References

External links
Anfrei Suslin, faculty profile, Department of Mathematics, Northwestern University

1950 births
2018 deaths
Northwestern University faculty
20th-century Russian mathematicians
21st-century Russian mathematicians
Algebraic geometers
Institute for Advanced Study visiting scholars
International Mathematical Olympiad participants
Mathematicians from Saint Petersburg